The Crown University International Chartered is a  global private, research university in Santa Cruz Province, Argentina, South America, which offers professional vocational training and higher education. Founded in 2011, the university has partners in Ghana, Benin Republic, Togo, Nigeria, Liberia, India, Israel, Saudi Arabia and other associates worldwide. It serves as an autonomous global university, offering education and practical skill in the courses taught in its main campus at Santa Cruz and on-campus studies by 42 worldwide affiliated colleges in 22 countries. Some of academic partners are Bharat University in India, Mother Teresa University in India, University of Kara Republic of Togo and Shimla University India

The Crown University International Chartered registered in the State of Delaware, United States and received global joint accreditation certificates and recognitions from the International Quality Assurance Agencies for Higher Education (INQAAHE), Board of Quality Standards (BQS), International Association of Transnational Universities, (IAU), the European Qualifications Framework (EQF), the Council for Higher Education Accreditation (CHEA), the African Quality Assurance Network (AfriQAN). In fall 2020, the Crown University International Chartered had 1,300 undergraduate, 1,000 graduate, 200-post doctorate students, 700 academic and 300 administrate staff. The university has an affiliation with various public, private and non-profit organizations such as the Chartered World Institute for Encyclopedia of Books Inc, West Coast University, International Chartered World Learned Society, Chartered World Order of the Knights of Justice of Peace, the International Centre for Eye Research and Education, the Prof. Sir Bashiru Aremu Intl. Foundation Inc, Africa International Institute for Professional Training and Research Intl Chartered.

References

Santa Cruz
Education in Santa Cruz Province, Argentina
Buildings and structures in Santa Cruz Province, Argentina